Polymesoda is a genus of clams in the family Cyrenidae. They were previously in the family Corbiculidae, before it was subsumed into Cyrenidae.

Species
Polymesoda acuta (Prime, 1861) (accepted > junior homonym)
 Polymesoda aequilatera (Deshayes, 1855)
Polymesoda anomala  (Deshayes, 1855)
Polymesoda arctata  (Deshayes, 1855)
Polymesoda boliviana (Philippi, 1851) (uncertain > nomen dubium)
  † Polymesoda bravoensis (Olsson, 1931)
 Polymesoda caroliniana (Bosc, 1801) – Carolina marsh clam
 † Polymesoda convexa (Brongniart, 1822) 
  † Polymesoda distorta (Ludwig, 1865)
Polymesoda exquisita (Prime, 1867)
Polymesoda floridana (Conrad, 1846)
Polymesoda fontainei  (d'Orbigny, 1842)
 Polymesoda fortis (Prime, 1861)
Polymesoda inflata (Philippi, 1851)
Polymesoda meridionalis (Prime, 1865)
Polymesoda mexicana  (Broderip & G. B. Sowerby I, 1829)
 † Polymesoda muravchiki Pérez, Genta Iturrería & Griffin, 2010 
Polymesoda notabilis (Deshayes, 1855)
 † Polymesoda obovata (J. Sowerby, 1817) 
 Polymesoda obscura (Prime, 1860)
Polymesoda ordinaria (Prime, 1865)
 Polymesoda placens (Hanley, 1845)
Polymesoda radiata (Hanley, 1845)
 † Polymesoda subarata (Schlotheim, 1820) 
 Polymesoda triangula (Busch in Philippi, 1849)
Polymesoda tribunalis (Prime, 1870)
 † Polymesoda trigalensis (Olsson, 1931) 
 † Polymesoda visenoviensis Kadolsky, 1989 
Synonyms
Polymesoda bengalensis (Lamarck, 1818) : synonym of Geloina bengalensis (Lamarck, 1818)
 Polymesoda coaxans (Gmelin, 1791): synonym of Geloina coaxans (Gmelin, 1791)
 Polymesoda maritima (Orbigny, 1853) – maritime marsh clam : synonym of Polymesoda floridana (Conrad, 1846)
Polymesoda powelli <small>>Valentich-Scott, 2012</small: synonym of Polymesoda radiata (Hanley, 1845)
Polymesoda proxima (Prime, 1864): synonym of Geloina coaxans (Gmelin, 1791)

References

Cyrenidae
Bivalve genera